In humans, the tectospinal tract (or colliculospinal tract) is a nerve tract that coordinates head and eye movements. This tract is part of the extrapyramidal system and  connects the midbrain tectum, and cervical regions of the spinal cord.

It is responsible for motor impulses that arise from one side of the midbrain to muscles on the opposite side of the body (contralateral).  The function of the tectospinal tract is to mediate reflex postural movements of the head in response to visual and auditory stimuli.

The portion of the midbrain from where this tract originates is the superior colliculus, which receives afferents from the visual nuclei (primarily the oculomotor nuclei complex), then projects to the contralateral (decussating dorsal to the mesencephalic duct) and ipsilateral portion of the first cervical neuromeres of the spinal cord, the oculomotor and trochlear nuclei in the midbrain and the abducens nucleus in the caudal portion of the pons.

The tract descends to the cervical spinal cord to terminate in Rexed laminae VI, VII, and VIII to coordinate head, neck, and eye movements, primarily in response to visual stimuli.

See also
 Spinotectal tract
 Upper motor neuron

References

External links
 Diagram at etsu.edu 
 Overview and diagram at uchicago.edu 
 

Spinal cord tracts
Motor system